Anne Marie Sigmund (born 1946) served as the U.S. Ambassador to Kyrgyzstan from 1997 to 2000.

References

1946 births
Ambassadors of the United States to Kyrgyzstan
American women ambassadors
Living people
United States Foreign Service personnel
21st-century American women